Intersection Mountain is a  mountain on the Continental Divide. The mountain is so named because it lies at the intersection of the 120th meridian where the British Columbia and Alberta border diverges from its line along the Divide northwards along the meridian.  The mountain is in Kakwa Provincial Park in British Columbia and Willmore Wilderness Park in Alberta and is near Casket Pass.

See also
 List of peaks on the British Columbia–Alberta border

References

Two-thousanders of Alberta
Two-thousanders of British Columbia
Canadian Rockies